Mohammad Al Shaibani may refer to:
 Mohammed Al Shaibani, government official in Dubai, United Arab Emirates 
 Mohammad al-Shaibani (born 1968), Yemeni poet and journalist
 Muhammad Shaybani (c. 1451–1510), Uzbek leader